Abū al-Ḥasan Sarī (al-Sirrī) b. al-Mughallis al-Saqaṭī (867CE) also known as Sirri Saqti (Arabic:سری سقطی) was one of the early Muslim Sufi saints of Baghdad. He was one of the most influential students of Maruf Karkhi and one of the first to present Sufism in a systematic way.  He was also a friend of Bishr al-Hafi. He was the maternal uncle and spiritual master of Junayd of Baghdad.

See also 
 List of Sufis
 Seyyed Qutb al-Din Mohammad Neyrizi

References 

Sunni Sufis
Sufi mystics
Iraqi Sufis
People from Baghdad